"I of the Storm" is a single recorded by the Icelandic indie folk/indie pop rock band Of Monsters and Men. The song was released as the second single from their second studio album, Beneath the Skin (2015). It was written by Nanna Bryndís Hilmarsdóttir and Ragnar Þórhallsson (of Of Monsters and Men). The single artwork was created by artistic director Leif Podhajsky.

Lyric video
The lyric video was released to the public via YouTube on 28 April 2015.

The lyric video begins with the single cover and, when the drums start, the actor Atli Freyr Demantur starts to dub the song's verses. The video was directed by Tjarnargatan.

Track listing

References

2015 singles
Of Monsters and Men songs
Universal Music Group singles
2015 songs